Obaid Al-Taweela is a retired football player from the United Arab Emirates, who played for Dubai, Thun, Al-Ahli, Baniyas and Al-Shaab. He was also loaned to Al-Wasl.

References

External links
 

Living people
Emirati footballers
Emirati expatriate footballers
Dubai CSC players
FC Thun players
Al Ahli Club (Dubai) players
Baniyas Club players
Al-Shaab CSC players
Al-Wasl F.C. players
2011 AFC Asian Cup players
United Arab Emirates international footballers
UAE Pro League players
UAE First Division League players
Association football goalkeepers
Expatriate footballers in Switzerland
Emirati expatriate sportspeople in Switzerland
1976 births